Cardosas is a civil parish in the municipality of Arruda dos Vinhos, Portugal. The population in 2011 was 836, in an area of 6.01 km2.

References

Freguesias of Arruda dos Vinhos